The 1974-75 2nd Bundesliga season was the second season of the 2nd Bundesliga, the second level of ice hockey in Germany. 10 teams participated in the league, and EV Rosenheim won the championship, and was promoted to the Ice hockey Bundesliga as a result. EV Landsberg was relegated to the Oberliga

Regular season

References

External links
Season on hockeyarchives.info

2nd Bundesliga (ice hockey) seasons
2